Lac de la Mouille is a lake in Haute-Savoie, France.

Mouille